ERA 9 is a Canadian rock band that was formed in Montreal, Quebec. These five Montrealers broke down all stylistic boundaries, combining the emotional release in electronic dance music, hip-hop, and the honest brutality of modern rock. They have an unofficial release which debuted their new sound called: Warrior.

History

Early years (2008–2009) 

ERA 9's roots formed in high school, where lead guitarist Jona Dhe Paganon and drummer Marco Leclerc first teamed up and recruited rhythm guitarist Joe D’Adamo. Phil (Vox) joined the band in answer to an online ad for a singer in March 2008. In September 2008, Eric Maddalena (bassist) joined the band.

ERA 9  (2010–2013) 

In early 2010, Phil's mentor and music teacher, Gail Issenman  introduced the band to  producer and sound engineer, Pierre Pinault (France D'amour, Nelly Furtado) and supported the band financially. In August 2010, the band entered the studio with Pierre Pinault, and recorded their self-titled debut album.

The band's  single "Goodnight" generated positive reviews. After introducing the video for their second single, "Calling Out," ERA 9 was invited to the Canadian Broadcasting Company (CBC) studios for interviews. The single was also featured on Quebec's number-one music television network, Montreal's Musique Plus.

In Summer of 2012, the band embarked on a national tour across Canada.

In the fall of 2012, the band entered studio with Glen Robinson to record the song, Now You Know, which was a free download to fans.

Following their eastern Canadian tour in November 2012, Era 9 won the SiriusXM "Rock the Grey Cup" contest and hence performed at the prestigious 100th Grey Cup Festival. There, ERA 9 shared the stage with revered Canadian acts such as Matthew Good, Sam Roberts, Our Lady Peace and Treble Charger.

Turn Day (2013–2015) 

In January 2013, due to personal reasons, Maddalena left the band. Bassist Andrew Costa joined the band in time for the recording of the Turn Day EP.

In early February of the same year, ERA 9 entered Martin Deschamps studio, in Rawdon, Quebec, with Glen Robinson to track drums for the upcoming EP, which was to be titled "Turn Day". The rest of the tracks were recorded at studio Multisons in Montreal. Quebec. Recording and mixing was completed in April and was then mastered at Sterling Sound by Ted Jensen (Breaking Benjamin, Green Day).

Turn Day was released in late 2013. The first single, "Oxygen," has a message of gratitude for all those who have helped along the way.

In June 2013, ERA 9 joined former Nine Inch Nails drummer Chris Vrenna's band, Kingdoom, on tour for four shows in Canadian cities. Then later that same month, the band embarked on a multi-date U. S. tour with Trapt that took them from Philadelphia to Milwaukee.

Later on, in summer and early fall, ERA 9 toured with Drowning Pool and Pop Evil, as well as performances in New York and Miami.  They played additional dates that took them through the mid west, to Texas and back up to Canada.,

In 2015, Era 9 toured in the United States, opening for Saliva in Cleveland.

Discography 

 ERA 9 (2011)
 Turn Day (2013)

Band members

Current members 

Anthony Lalla lead vocals 2016–present
Laurie Normandin lead vocals 2016–present
Marco Leclerc drums 2010–present
Jona Dhe Paganon guitars 2010–present
Joe D'Adamo bass, guitars 2010–present

Former members 

Eric Maddalena bass, backing vocals 2010-2012
Andrew Costa bass, backing vocals 2013-2014
Philip Paolino lead vocals 2010-2016

References

External links
"Era 9: The New Era of Rock and Roll"/ Backstage Press

Canadian rock music groups
Musical groups established in 2010
Musical groups from Montreal
2010 establishments in Quebec